Pixxel is a India based private space technology company, aiming to put a constellation of 30+ hyperspectral earth observation micro-satellites into a sun-synchronous orbit in 2020s. It was founded by Awais Ahmed and Kshitij Khandelwal while still studying at BITS Pilani in 2019. Pixxel was also Asia's only space startup to qualify for the 2019 Techstars Starburst Space Accelerator in Los Angeles.

History
Pixxel's first satellite, Anand, was earlier scheduled to be launched in late 2020 on a Soyuz rocket. It later entered in an agreement with India's state owned NSIL to use a PSLV rocket for launching it in early 2021. Its launch on board the PSLV-C51 was delayed in February 2021 due to technical issues. It is now expected to launch on-board the PSLV-C54/EOS-06 mission. The PSLV-C54 was successfully launched on 26 November 2022 at 11:56 IST / 06:12 UTC.

Pixxel launched the first of its three demonstration satellite through a hosted camera payload partnership with the Lithuanian firm, NanoAvionics on 30 June 2021 in their D2/Altacom-1 satellite on a SpaceX Falcon-9 rideshare mission, Transporter-2.

Pixxel launched its second satellite, Shakuntala/TD-2 on a SpaceX Falcon-9 rideshare mission, Transporter-4 on April 1, 2022.

Anand and Shakuntala are a part of the three demonstration satellites that Pixxel planned to launch. It plans to launch the first 6 satellites of its Firefly constellation in 2023 and 12 more by the end of 2024.

Pixxel announced that it will provide the highest resolution commercially available hyperspectral images. It raised $2.3 million in March 2021 from Techstars, Omnivore VC and others. This is in addition to the $5 million it raised in August 2020 from Lightspeed Ventures and others. Canadian firm Radical Ventures led a $25 million funding round in March 2022. The company has raised total funding of $33 million.

The company claims that its constellation is designed to provide global coverage at a revisit of every 24 hours.

See also 
 
 List of private spaceflight companies
 Skyroot Aerospace
 Satellize
 Indian Space Research Organisation
 New Space India Limited
 Bellatrix Aerospace

References 

Space programme of India
Indian private spaceflight companies
2019 establishments in Karnataka
Companies based in Bangalore
Indian companies established in 2019